The men's 200 metres event at the 1994 Commonwealth Games was held on 25 and 26 August at the Centennial Stadium in Victoria, British Columbia.

Medalists

Results

Heats
Wind:Heat 1: -1.5 m/s, Heat 2: ? m/s, Heat 3: +0.6 m/s, Heat 4: +0.1 m/s, Heat 5: +0.6 m/s, Heat 6: +1.2 m/s, Heat 7: +0.7 m/s, Heat 8: +0.6 m/s, Heat 9: +0.5 m/s,

Quarterfinals
Wind:Heat 1: +2.0 m/s, Heat 2: +1.6 m/s, Heat 3: +1.6 m/s, Heat 4: +1.5 m/s

Semifinals
Wind:Heat 1: +0.2 m/s, Heat 2: -0.1 m/s

Final
Wind: +1.5 m/s

References

200
1994